Leonard Bilson (25 September 1681 –  28 June 1715) was an MP for Petersfield during the early 18th century.

He was the son of Thomas Bilson of West Mapledurham and Susanna née Legge. He was educated at New College, Oxford. He was Commissioner of the Portsmouth and Sheet Turnpike Trust from 1711; and a Freeman of Portsmouth, also from 1711.

References

Alumni of New College, Oxford
17th-century English people
18th-century English people
1681 births
1715 deaths
People from Petersfield
English MPs 1702–1705
English MPs 1705–1707
British MPs 1707–1708
British MPs 1708–1710
British MPs 1710–1713
British MPs 1713–1715